The WCF World Rankings system is designed to track and list the amount of success achieved by each member association of the World Curling Federation (WCF) in a given curling season. The system, which was implemented in December 2006, is similar to the ranking system used by FIFA. The events taken into account when calculating each nation's score include the Olympic and Paralympic games, the World Curling Championships, and the various qualifying events for member associations who did not compete in the worlds. The system was developed by Patrick Hürlimann, who is a former Olympic champion and was the vice president of the WCF from 2010 to 2012. The calculation method was overhauled for the 2018–19 season.

Current rankings

Women

Men

Wheelchair

Mixed doubles

Mixed

Current calculation method

The points are calculated for each member association based on performance during the last four curling seasons. Once points are distributed, the total for each member association is divided by the maximum number of points available. 

Results in seasons prior to the current season are scaled by the following factors:

Points distribution
Points are allocated based on the final rankings of each member association at an eligible event.

International events
The points distributions for the World Curling Championships and Olympic and Paralympic Games are given as follows:

Qualification events
Member associations that do not qualify for the Worlds are given points based on their performance in regional or qualifying events, from 45 points to 1 point. The distribution varies depending on the event.

2006–18 calculation method

The points are calculated for each nation based on performance during the last six curling seasons. Results in seasons prior to the current season are scaled by the following factors:

Points distribution
Points are allocated based on the final rankings of each nation at an eligible event.

International events
The points distributions are given for each event as follows:

Regional events
All nations that qualify for the World Curling Championships receive 50 points, regardless of final ranking in regional events, if applicable.

Nations in the European or Pacific Curling Championships that do not qualify for the World Championships receive less than 50 points. Based on their final ranking in the tournament, nations receive 49 or fewer points, in decrements of 1 point.

References

External links
http://www.worldcurling.org/worldrankings

World Curling Federation
Curling